The Amalgamated Press (AP) was a British newspaper and magazine publishing company founded by journalist and entrepreneur Alfred Harmsworth (1865–1922) in 1901, gathering his many publishing ventures together under one banner. At one point the largest publishing company in the world, AP employed writers such as Arthur Mee, John Alexander Hammerton, Edwy Searles Brooks, and Charles Hamilton. Its subsidiary, the Educational Book Company, published The Harmsworth Self-Educator, The Children's Encyclopædia, and Harmsworth's Universal Encyclopaedia. The company's newspapers included the Daily Mail, the Daily Mirror, The Evening News, The Observer, and The Times. At its height, AP published over 70 magazines and operated three large printing works and paper mills in South London.

History

Harmsworth Brothers Ltd 
In 1888 Alfred Harmsworth and his younger brother Harold (1868–1940) started Harmsworth Brothers, with Alfred acting as publisher and Harold handling the finances. The first thing they did was found a paper called Answers to Correspondents, which was modeled after another popular paper called Tit-Bits (published by George Newnes). Harmsworth entered the comic magazine market in 1890 with Comic Cuts and Illustrated Chips; The comic Wonder, launched in 1892, was part of a long string of connected titles which stretched from 1892 to 1953, known by a variety of additional names, including Funny Wonder and Jester.

Also in 1890, Harmsworth began publishing periodicals to challenge and compete with the penny dreadfuls popular among British youth. Priced at one half-penny, Harmsworth's story papers were cheaper and, at least initially, were more respectable than the competition. Harmsworth claimed to be motivated by a wish to challenge the pernicious influence of penny dreadfuls. AP's Halfpenny Marvel, launched in 1893, was soon followed by a number of other Harmsworth half-penny periodicals, such as The Union Jack (1894–1933) and Pluck (also started in 1894), and the serialized boys' story papers The Boys' Friend (1895). At first the stories were high-minded moral tales, reportedly based on true experiences, but it was not long before these papers started using the same kind of material as the publications they competed against.

Beginning in 1894, the Harmsworth brothers dove into the newspaper business, first acquiring The Evening News and the Edinburgh Daily Record. Harmsworth founded the Daily Mail in 1896, which was a success, having the world record for daily circulation until Harmsworth's death.

Harmsworth founded the woman's magazine Home Chat (1895–1959) to compete with C. Arthur Pearson's Home Notes.

In 1896, Harmsworth Brothers Ltd was incorporated as a limited company. By this time, combined weekly sales of the company's publications exceeded one million copies, more than any other magazine publisher in the world.

Formation and expansion of Amalgamated Press 
In 1901, Harmsworth gathered his many publishing ventures together under the banner of Amalgamated Press.

In 1902, the company opened offices in Manchester, also setting up a system of codes and telegraphs that streamlined the layout and printing process.

Expanding his newspaper empire, Harmsworth initiated the Daily Mirror during 1903, and rescued the financially desperate The Observer and The Times during 1905 and 1908, respectively. During 1908, he also acquired The Sunday Times.

The quality of the AP story papers began to improve throughout the early 20th century. They also proliferated, with AP launching new boys' papers like The Gem (1907–1939) and The Magnet (1908–1940). By the time of the First World War, papers such as Union Jack dominated the market in the UK. Post-World War I story papers launched by AP included The Champion (1922–1955) and The Thriller (1929–1937).

Recognizing the popularity of the story papers with girls, AP editor Reg Eves launched a girl's line, the most notable being School Friend (1919–1929), Schoolgirls' Own (1921–1936), and The Schoolgirl (1922–1923; 1929–1940).

AP's My Magazine was published from 1908 to 1933 with different names; it had articles on science, technology, geography, and current events.

From 1912 Amalgamated Press was based at Fleetway House in Farringdon Street, London.

Amalgamated Press acquired the assets of James Henderson & Sons Ltd in 1920.

AP story papers faced tougher competition in the 1930s with the rise of DC Thomson's line, including The Hotspur (launched in 1933).

Comic Cuts and Illustrated Chips continued strongly into the 20th century; other notable pre-War humorous comics titles published by AP included Film Fun (launched in 1920), Radio Fun (1938), and Knockout (1939).

Harmsworth's death; Allied Newspapers; William Berry 
Alfred Harmsworth died in 1922, and in 1926 Amalgamated Press was bought by William and Gomer Berry of Allied Newspapers. Shortly after this sale, in 1927, AP acquired and continued publishing a number of Cassell & Co.'s periodicals, including  Cassell's Magazine,  The Story-Teller, and Chums.

The Berry brothers dissolved their partnership in 1937, with William Berry (Lord Camrose) retaining Amalgamated Press.

Editor Leonard Matthews (1914–1997), who joined AP in 1939, was a leading figure in the company's comics titles for 20 years, eventually becoming Manager Editor.

The onset of World War II, in the years 1940–1942, brought the merger and cancellation of a number of long-running AP comics titles, including Butterfly and Puck (both launched in 1904),	Jester (launched in 1912), Tiger Tim's Weekly (1919), Sunbeam	(1922), The Joker (1927), Larks (1927), Bubbles (1921), Chicks' Own (1929), and Funny Wonder series 3 (dating back to 1914).

Seymour Berry, 2nd Viscount Camrose, the eldest son of William Berry, was Vice Chairman of Amalgamated Press from 1942 until the company's sale in 1959.

In May 1949, AP acquired the publisher J. B. Allen, including their comics titles The Comet and Sun, which they continued under the same names. AP launched a number of notable comics in the 1950s, including School Friend (launched in 1950; considered the first girls' comic), Lion (1952), Tiger (1954), and the young children's comics Jack and Jill and Playhour (both 1954).

Another round of mergers and cancellations of long-running AP comics titles occurred in the years 1952–1957, including Illustrated Chips and Comic Cuts (both launched in 1890), Jingles (launched in 1934), Tip Top (launched in 1934), Playbox (launched in 1925), The Rainbow (launched in 1914), and Tiny Tots (launched in 1920).

Acquisition by the Mirror Group/IPC 
In 1959, Amalgamated Press was bought by the Mirror Group and renamed Fleetway Publications (after the name of AP's headquarters, Fleetway House). AP titles that were continued by IPC/Fleetway included: 

 Confessions Library (1959 series)
 Cowboy Picture Library (1950 series; originally known as Cowboy Comics)
 Famous Romance Library (1956 series)
 Film Fun (1920 series)
 Girls' Crystal (1935 series)
 Knockout (1939 series)
 Lion (1952 series)
 Marilyn (1955 series)
 Playhour (1954 series)
 Radio Fun (1938 series)
 Roxy (1958 series)
 School Friend (1950 series)
 Super Detective Library (1953 series)
 Thriller Comics (1951 series)
 Tiger (1954 series)
 Top Spot (1958 series)
 TV Fun (1953 series)
 Valentine (1957 series)

With the transition to Fleetway, the AP titles The Comet, Sun, and Tiny Tots were all merged into other AP titles: Tiger, Lion, and Playhour, respectively. Radio Fun was continued by Fleetway for a short time and then merged into Buster in 1960. Similarly, TV Fun was renamed TV Fan, continued for a short time, and then was merged into Valentine.

In 1961, the Mirror Group also acquired Odhams Press (which by that point owned Longacre Press and Newnes/Pearson). The group was renamed the International Publishing Corporation in 1963, although the component companies continued to use their own names until 1968 when they were reorganised into the unitary IPC Magazines. The "Fleetway" banner continued to be used for some publications until IPC's comics line was sold under the name Fleetway Publications to Robert Maxwell in 1987.

Of the comics titles IPC acquired from Amalgamated Press, only five survived into the 1970s: Jack and Jill, Lion, Playhour, Tiger, and Valentine; of those five, Jack and Jill, Playhour, and Tiger survived until the mid-1980s.

Rebellion Developments currently owns all comics characters and titles created by IPC's subsidiaries after 1 January 1970, together with 26 specified characters which appeared in Buster; while IPC currently retains its other comics characters and titles, including Sexton Blake, The Steel Claw, and Battler Britton.

Newspapers 
 Daily Mail (founded 1896; acquired by Harold Harmsworth in 1922)
 Daily Mirror (founded 1903; sold to Harold Harmsworth in 1913)
 The Evening News (acquired in 1894)
 Edinburgh Daily Record (founded 1894)
 The Observer (acquired in 1903; sold in 1911)
 The Sunday Times (acquired in 1908; sold in 1915)
 The Times (acquired in 1908; sold in 1922)

Books

 The Boy's Book of Everyday Science (1937), edited by Charles Ray
 The Concise Household Encyclopedia (1932–1939) edited by J A Hammerton. 
 Everybody's Enquire Within, edited by Charles Ray, published in 55 weekly instalments from 1937 to 1938.
 The Great War: The Standard History of the All-Europe Conflict (1914-1919), edited by Wilson and Hammerton
 Harmsworth's Universal Encyclopaedia (1921/1922)
 "Wonders" — all edited by Clarence Winchester, and published by Amalgamated Press as weekly instalments, with a book binding service available to keep as two volumes for each series.
 Railway Wonders of the World, 50 installments (1935–36) 
 Shipping Wonders of the World, 55 installments (1936–37)
 Wonders of World Engineering, 53 installments (1937–38)
 Wonders of World Aviation, 40 installments (1938)
 The World of Wonder: 10,000 Things Every Child Should Know (1933), edited by Charles Ray. Published in two volumes: Vol. One, pages 1 to 732; Vol. Two, pages 733 to 1460. An illustrated compendium of mainly science and technology, with some historical subjects.

Periodicals 
 Cassell's Magazine (1927–1932) — acquired from Cassell & Co., where it originated in 1897; merged into Storyteller
 The Children's Encyclopædia (1908–1964)
 The Children's Newspaper (1919–1965)
 Everybody's Weekly (1950–1959) — acquired from Everybody's Publications Ltd., where it originated in 1913; merged into Odhams' John Bull
  The Green Magazine (1922–1923)
 The Harmsworth Red Magazine (1908–1939)
 The Harmsworth Self-Educator (1905–1907)
 Home Chat (1895–1959)
 London Magazine (1898–1933)
 The Modern Boy (1928–1939)
 My Magazine (1908–1933)
 Picture Show (1919–1960)
 Storyteller (1927–1937) — acquired from Cassell & Co., where it originated in 1907
 Woman & Home (from 1926)
 Woman's Weekly (from 1911)
 The World (1905-1920), a weekly society paper originated in 1874 — acquired from the widow of Edmund Hodgson Yates in 1905
 The Yellow Magazine (1921–1926)

Story papers 

 The Boys' Friend (1895–1927)
 The Boys' Herald (1903–1913)
 The Boy's Realm  (1902–1916; 1919–1929)
 The Champion (1922–1955)
 Chums (1927–1941) — acquired from Cassell & Co., where it originated in 1892
 The Gem (1907–1939)
 Halfpenny Marvel (1893–1922)
 The Magnet (1908–1940)
 Pluck (1894–1916; 1922–1924)
 School Friend (1919–1929)
 The Schoolgirl (1922–1923; 1929–1940)
 Schoolgirls' Own (1921–1936)
 The Thriller (1929–1937)
 The Triumph (1924–1940)
 The Union Jack (1894–1933)

Notable comics titles

Notes

References

External links

 Complete List of Harmsworth/Fleetway/IPC comic titles
 Amalgamated Press at the Grand Comics Database
 

1901 establishments in England
British companies established in 1901
Comic book publishing companies of the United Kingdom
Magazine publishing companies of the United Kingdom
Publishing companies established in 1901
Publishers of Sexton Blake
Fleetway and IPC Comics